Charlie Holmes (23 January 1910 – 30 July 1981) was an  Australian rules footballer who played with Fitzroy in the Victorian Football League (VFL).

Notes

External links 
		

1910 births
1981 deaths
Australian rules footballers from Victoria (Australia)
Fitzroy Football Club players